Iron Fist Global LLC (previously Iron Fist Records, not to be confused with the Indian-based Iron Fist Records) is an American hip hop record label, founded in 2004 by DeShaun 'Proof' Holton. Cleveland '1st Born' Hurd is the current president and chief executive officer of the label, Khalid El Hakim is the vice-president and chief operations officer.

Big Proof 
The first release via Iron Fist Records was its founder's I Miss The Hip Hop Shop dropped on June 15, 2004.

The label became well known with Iron Fist recorded Proof's first widespread solo album, Searching for Jerry Garcia, which included guest appearances by the likes of Method Man, B-Real, 50 Cent, Obie Trice, now deceased rappers Nate Dogg and MC Breed, the whole D12 band including Eminem. The album reached number 65 on the U.S. Billboard 200.

After Proof's death (April 11, 2006), 1st Born, a close friend of Big Proof became CEO and president of the label.

1st Born 
Proof placed Cleveland L. Hurd (professionally known as 1st Born) the helm of his label Iron Fist Records. As an artist, he appeared in videos such as Eminem's "Like Toy Soldiers", D12's "Fight Music", Big Proof's "Gurls Wit Da Boom", Bizarre's "Hip Hop", and Obie Trice's "Cry Now". As CEO and founder of Detroit's award-winning rap group Purple G.A.N.G. (Gettin Anything Niggaz Got), he is also credited with touring nationally three times. Twice with Eminem on his Anger Management tours featuring 50 Cent, Ludacris, Ras Kass, Mobb Deep, Papa Roach, M.O.P., Executioners, Lil' Jon, Saafir, G-Unit, and Bonecrusher. He was also opened up for D12 on 'The D12 World Tour' alongside Slum Village, Guilty Simpson, Black Milk, and Fat Killahz. He has also opened shows for legendary acts such as the Souls Of Mischief, Xzibit, MC Breed, Wu-Tang Clan, Bubba Sparxxx, Twista and a host of others. In the past he has worked as project manager/marketing strategist for Fly High Entertainment/Hoopla/Universal artist. As President of Iron Fist Global he has been developing and determining market strategies for artists such as Big Proof, JerkNation, Big Dame, Azizz, J Hill, Comedian Howie Bell Spanky Hayes and DC's sensation Shif-T of Pretti Punk'd.

Issues 
Iron Fist Global is committed to preserving and honoring Big Proof's legacy as pioneer, entrepreneur and leader in the music and arts industries by focusing in the areas of music, artist education, educational scholarships and mentor-ship targeting talented youth in the metro Detroit area, as well as the broader community, developing and assisting artists as well as providing opportunity artists to pursue their dreams.

People
Some of the Detroit artists who were or still signed by IronFist Records:
Purple Gang (Killa Kaunn, 1st Born, T-Flame, Young Famous)
Supa Emcee 
J-Hill
Az-Izz
Ricky Rucker
IMAC 
Big Dame
Sovereign T
Woof Pac (J Kid, Hostyle, Moe Dirdee)
J Lee (producer)
KenMak (producer)
Spanky Hayes (comedian)

IronFist Records affiliative artists (credited as XFAM)
Hex Murda & The Almighty Dreadnaughtz
Raw Collection
Runyon Ave

Notable actions
Iron Fist Records LLC has received numerous awards for Lyricist of the year, Artist of the year, Group of the year, Album of the year and Mix Tape CD of the year honored by the Detroit Hip Hop Music awards from 2005 to 2006.

Resources 

2005 establishments in Michigan
American record labels
Companies based in Detroit
Hip hop record labels
Record labels established in 2005